Trachsel is a surname. Notable people with the surname include:

 Hansjörg Trachsel (born 1948), Swiss politician and bobsledder
 Steve Trachsel (born 1970), American baseball player
 Albert Trachsel (1863–1929), Swiss painter, architect, and writer